Matthew Owain Rees (born 27 July 2005) is a British racing driver from Wales who last competed in the 2022 GB3 Championship, driving for JHR Developments. He was the 2021 F4 British Championship champion, and is a BRDC Superstar.

Career

Karting 
Rees competed in various karting championships across the United Kingdom, before he drove in international karting in 2018 and 2019, including in the FIA European Karting Championship and the FIA Karting World Championship.

F4 British Championship 
Rees made his car racing debut in the 2021 F4 British Championship, driving for JHR Developments. He took double pole position at round 1, but finished 13th in race 1 after an unsuccessful tyre gamble. After taking another double pole at the second round at Snetterton Circuit, he converted this into victory in race 1 and race 3. He took pole position for race 1 at the third round at Brands Hatch, making it his fifth consecutive pole of the season. 

After a quieter middle of the season, Rees took double pole position at the penultimate round at Donington Park, and converted it into wins in the first and third race. Entering the final round of the season in the championship lead, Rees finished in the top 5 in all three races, enough to seal the overall title and rookie title.

GB3 Championship

2022 
On 12 January 2022, it was announced that Rees would step up to the 2022 GB3 Championship, driving again for JHR Developments. He finished third in his debut race, and took two other podiums finished across the season, including a win at Brands Hatch, and pole at the same weekend after Tom Lebbon received a grid penalty from the previous round. He finished 6th in the standings.

2023 
Rees re-signed with JHR Developments for the 2023 GB3 Championship.

Karting record

Karting career summary

Racing record

Racing career summary

Complete F4 British Championship results 
(key) (Races in bold indicate pole position) (Races in italics indicate fastest lap)

Complete GB3 Championship results 
(key) (Races in bold indicate pole position) (Races in italics indicate fastest lap)

References

External links
 

2005 births
Living people
British racing drivers
Welsh racing drivers
Sportspeople from Cardiff
British F4 Championship drivers
JHR Developments drivers